Wuttagoonaspidae is a family of primitive arthrodire placoderms from Early Devonian China and Middle Devonian Australia.

References

 
Placoderm families
Early Devonian first appearances
Middle Devonian extinctions